Maddison Bullock is an American SAG actress, producer, and writer. She is the owner of a production company called Maddness Pictures and she is also a professional figure skater. She has made dozens of appearances over the course of her career in both TV and Film. She trained at the United States Olympic Training Center in Colorado for Figure Skating and competed for Team USA with the Los Angeles Ice Theater. She volunteers as a young girls ambassador for the anti-bullying organization Boo2Bullying.

Film career 
Maddison has appeared on NBC, ABC, Tru TV, and Netflix. Her production company, Maddness Pictures, produced a film titled ICE: the Movie which was written by and starring Maddison. This film draws from her experience in Professional Figure Skating and emphasizes good sportsmanship, family values, and artistic excellence. The film co-stars Lisa Mihelich. both Maddison and Lisa performed their own figure skating stunts for the film.

Figure skating career 
Maddison is a former competitive figure skater. Her experience as a competitive figure skater allowed her to write an authentic film about the world of competitive ice skating called ICE: The Movie. The film also includes some of her former competitive skating coaches and judges.

Maddison founded Maddness Pictures.

Boo2Bullying 
Bullock serves as a Young Girl's Ambassador for Cassie Scerbo's Anti-Bullying Nonprofit Boo2Bullying.

Filmography

Actress

Producer

Writer

References

External links
Official website

Living people
American female figure skaters
People from Douglas County, Colorado
Sportspeople from Colorado
Actresses from Colorado
Year of birth missing (living people)
21st-century American women